The Kirkuk Massacre of 1924 was a massacre of the people of Kirkuk in Mandatory Iraq, carried out by Assyrian Levies on May 4, 1924.

In early 1924, during the Mahmud Barzanji revolts, the British Empire deployed Assyrian Levies to Kirkuk province in order to use them as ground forces to capture the Kurdish city of Sulaimanya.

On 4 May, an argument over prices took place in the local market, which led to physical fighting. The Levies then rushed back to their camps, where they gathered rifles and armed men. According to British Documents on Foreign Affairs--reports and Papers from the Foreign Office Confidential Print: The expansion of Ibn Saud, 1922-1925, "[t]wo Assyrian battalions then went back to the town, on the way they savagely assaulted a number of Muslims sitting in coffee shops, destroying furniture and beating the customers". The Assyrian Levies also fired their weapons into streets and houses from rooftops, and looted shops and houses.

More than 300 Kurds, Arabs, and Turkmens were killed during the massacre, with dozens more injured.

See also 
 Iraq Levies
 Kurdish Revolts
 Gavurbağı massacre

References 

Kirkuk
May 1924 events